The Fahey–Armstrong ministry or Third Fahey ministry was the 84th ministry of the New South Wales Government, and was led by the 38th Premier of New South Wales, John Fahey, representing the Liberal Party in coalition with the National Party, led by Ian Armstrong.

The ministry covers the period from 26 May 1993 until 4 April 1995, when the coalition was defeated at the 1995 state election by Labor, led by Bob Carr.

Composition of ministry
The ministry commenced on 26 May 1993 and there was a single rearrangement in June 1994, when Terry Griffiths was forced to resign from both the ministry and the Liberal Party over claims of sexual harassment.

 
Ministers are members of the Legislative Assembly unless otherwise noted.

See also

Members of the New South Wales Legislative Assembly, 1991–1995
Members of the New South Wales Legislative Council, 1991–1995

Notes

References

 

! colspan="3" style="border-top: 5px solid #cccccc" | New South Wales government ministries

New South Wales ministries
1993 establishments in Australia
1995 disestablishments in Australia